The World Allround Speed Skating Championships for Men took place on 17 and 18 February 1990 in Innsbruck at the Eisschnelllaufbahn Innsbruck ice rink.

Title holder was the Netherlander Leo Visser.

Classification

  * = Fell
  DNS = Did not start

Source:

References

World Allround Speed Skating Championships, 1990
1990 World Allround

Attribution
In Dutch